On April 23–25, 1908, a destructive tornado outbreak affected portions of the Midwestern and Southern United States, including the Great Plains. The outbreak produced at least 31  tornadoes in 13 states, with a total of at least 324 tornado-related deaths. Of these deaths, most were caused by three long-tracked, violent tornadoes—each rated F4 on the Fujita scale and considered to be a tornado family—that occurred on April 24. Most of the deaths were in rural areas, often consisted of African Americans, and consequently may have been undercounted. One of the tornadoes killed 143 people along its path, 73 of them in the U.S. state of Mississippi, making the tornado the third deadliest in Mississippi history, following the 1936 Tupelo F5, with 216 deaths, and the 1840 Natchez tornado, with 317 deaths.

Confirmed tornadoes

April 23 event

April 24 event

April 25 event

Concordia Parish, Louisiana/Pine Ridge–Church Hill, Mississippi

The first of two major, long-tracked, violent tornadoes first began at about 5:00 a.m. CST just north of Lamourie. Upon touching down, the tornado immediately killed three people at Richland and then four more at Ruby soon after touching down. As it crossed into Avoyelles Parish, it caused 25 injuries between the communities of Effie and Center Point. Farther along the path, two more people were killed near New Era. At least 30 people died in Concordia Parish as many tenant homes were completely leveled. The massive tornado then crossed into Mississippi just north of Vidalia, Louisiana, and Natchez, Mississippi, devastating many more plantations, killing at least 30 more people, and injuring about 200, especially near Pine Ridge. Large antebellum mansions were destroyed, and witnesses reported that areas along the Mississippi River resembled a "deserted battlefield". The tornado then struck the Church Hill area, killing 21 people in frail tenant homes before dissipating near Tillman. At least 400 people were injured along the path, though the actual total, as in other tornadoes this day, was likely higher as most newspapers in the South failed to list Black dead and injured, many of whom were poor sharecroppers.

Amite–Pine, Louisiana/Purvis–Richton, Mississippi

The second of the two long-tracked F4s was one of the deadliest tornadoes in U.S. history. An exceptionally large and intense tornado, it first began at about 11:45 a.m. CST in Weiss, just north of Livingston. Two people were killed at Denham Springs near the beginning of the path. Two others were killed near Montpelier as well. Many structures were completely destroyed in Amite, and 29 people were killed. Four others were killed near Wilmer, along with nine additional fatalities occurring near Pine. The tornado crossed into Mississippi, killing two before tearing through Purvis and devastating most of the town. Only seven of the town's 150 buildings were left standing, and 55 people were killed. Five other fatalities were documented in rural areas outside Purvis as well. The boxcars were thrown  and torn apart by the tornado. Several other fatalities occurred near Richton before the tornado dissipated. At least 770 people were injured along the entire path, though the real total was likely higher, perhaps significantly so, as many minor injuries were probably ignored—an omission still common in contemporary tornado disasters. With at least 143 deaths, the Amite–Purvis tornado is officially the eighth deadliest in U.S. history, though its long path may have actually consisted of two or more tornadoes.

Bergens–Southern Albertville–Northern Sylvania, Alabama

A destructive tornado first began at about 2:40 p.m. CST in southeast Walker County, Alabama, though its actual genesis may have occurred earlier. It first touched down somewhere southwest of Dora and moved northeast, whence it was seen to merge with a "black cloud," possibly another tornado which was then moving east and dissipating. According to reports, the damage swath on the west side of the tornado briefly shrank as it neared Bergens, causing nearby residents of Dora to believe that a row of hills had deflected the winds from their town. In Bergens, the tornado completely destroyed most of the homes and "leveled" the village church and the store. Of the 42 homes in Bergens, only one remained undamaged, and most of them were destroyed. Six people in Bergens died instantly and two more later expired of their injuries; of the 16 remaining injured, at least four more died to make the final death toll 12 at Bergens.

Next, the "coal-black" funnel struck Warrior and the town of Wynnville, killing two people each at both locations. Turning to the north-northeast, the tornado then crossed into Marshall County and struck Albertville, destroying half the town. An oil tank weighing  was carried  at this location, and a train was overturned and destroyed. At least 15 people died in Albertville and 150 were injured. The tornado continued through heavily forested areas along the remainder of its path, possibly dissipating and reforming into a new tornado. It passed through Ten Broeck and the northern edge of Sylvania before ending, having traveled at least  and possibly as long as  within one hour and 35 minutes. Although the tornado killed 35 people, it only injured 188, likely due to the low population of the area impacted.

See also
List of North American tornadoes and tornado outbreaks
April 1924 tornado outbreak – Produced a deadly F3 tornado in Pine Mountain
2008 Atlanta tornado outbreak – Produced an EF2 tornado in Downtown Atlanta

Notes

References

Sources
 
 

 

F5 tornadoes
Tornadoes of 1908
Tornadoes in Louisiana
Tornadoes in Mississippi
1908 in Louisiana
1908 in Mississippi
Tornado outbreaks
1908 natural disasters in the United States
April 1908 events